Borysiuk is a surname. Notable people with the surname include:

Ariel Borysiuk (born 1991), Polish footballer
Bolesław Borysiuk (born 1948), Polish politician